Joaquim Ferreira Bogalho (11 December 1889 – 1 October 1977), also known as "the man of the stadium", was the 20th president of Portuguese sports club S.L. Benfica.

Bogalho was born in Alcobaça in 1889. After being awarded the Águia de Ouro (Golden Eagle) by Benfica on 31 July 1938, he was elected president of the club on 15 March 1952, a position he held until 30 March 1957, being reelected four times. He is considered the main responsible for the modernisation and professionalisation of the football team in 1954 with the signing of coach Otto Glória, and the construction of the original Estádio da Luz and the Centro de Estágio (Training Center), also known as Lar do Jogador (Player's Home). During his five-year presidency, Benfica won the Primeira Liga and Taça de Portugal in the same season twice, and more than doubled the number of club members (sócios).

Bogalho died on 1 October 1977.

References

External links
 O Estádio da Luz (05:22) RTP Arquivos 

1889 births
1977 deaths
People from Alcobaça, Portugal
S.L. Benfica presidents
Sportspeople from Leiria District